The Kingdom of Great Britain was governed by a caretaker government in April–June 1757—after the King's dismissal of William Pitt led to the collapse of the Pitt–Devonshire ministry amid the Seven Years' War. William Cavendish, 4th Duke of Devonshire, continued as the nominal head of government.

History

In 1756, King George was reluctantly compelled to accept a ministry dominated by William Pitt as Secretary of State. The nominal head of this ministry, as First Lord of the Treasury, was the Duke of Devonshire.

On 6 April 1757, following Pitt's opposition to the execution of Admiral John Byng, the King (who distrusted Pitt) dismissed him and his brother-in-law Lord Temple, who had been First Lord of the Admiralty. The result of these events was to demonstrate beyond doubt that the "Great Commoner" (as Pitt was familiarly known) was indispensable to the formation of a ministry strong enough to prosecute a major war.

Devonshire was left to lead a ministry that was manifestly far too weak to survive long—particularly in wartime. One of the major problems was that it included no figure capable of taking the lead in the House of Commons. The ministry also lacked the support of the most significant factions in the Commons.

Devonshire recognised that it was necessary to reconcile Pitt and his old political foe Thomas Pelham-Holles, 1st Duke of Newcastle, who led the strongest Whig faction in Parliament, but whose exclusion Pitt had insisted from the 1756–57 ministry.

The King (after discussions with Devonshire and Newcastle in May) authorised Philip Yorke, 1st Earl of Hardwicke, to be his emissary to negotiate for a new ministry. Hardwick pleaded with Pitt to work with Newcastle in heading "a complete, strong, and well-cemented" government, as opposed to "a  system".

The needs of the country and the lack of an obvious alternative led to the reappointment of Pitt as Secretary of State (with Newcastle as First Lord of the Treasury) on 27 June, forming the Pitt–Newcastle ministry. Devonshire resigned the office of First Lord to take up the less demanding responsibilities of Lord Chamberlain.

Leading members

See also
 11th Parliament of Great Britain
 1757 in Great Britain

Notes

References

 
 
 
 
 
 

British ministries
Government
Political history of the United Kingdom
1757 establishments in Great Britain
1757 disestablishments in Great Britain
Ministries of George II of Great Britain
1750s in Great Britain
Caretaker governments